Eoperipatus horsti is a species of velvet worm in the Peripatidae family. This species is brown with pale spots and a darker line running down the middle of its back. Females of this species have 24 or 25 pairs of legs; males have 23 or 24, usually 23. The males of this species can reach 40 mm in length, and the females can reach 46 mm in length, but the average specimen is 34 mm in length. The type locality is in West Malaysia.

References

Onychophoran species
Onychophorans of southeast Asia
Animals described in 1901